Barry O'Neil (September 24, 1865 – March 23, 1918) was a film director and writer. His real name was Thomas J. McCarthy. He directed several Thanhouser films including the production company's first two-reeler, Romeo and Juliet. He went on to work for Lubin and then World Film Corporation.

He was born in New York City.

O'Neil married actress Nellie Walters. In 1913 O'Neil was elected to The Lambs as a non-resident member. He died of apoplexy.

In 1910 and 1911 he filmed adaptations of a couple William Shakespeare plays. In 1915 he filmed a version of McTeague in Death Valley released as Life's Whirlpool. William E. Hamilton was an assistant director to O'Neil.

Filmography

Director
The Actor's Children (1910)
The Mad Hermit (1910)
Uncle Tom's Cabin (1910 film)
The Writing on the Wall (1910)
The Girl of the Northern Woods (1910)
The Winter's Tale (1910)
St. Elmo (1910)
The Actor's Children (1910)
Romeo and Juliet (1911)
The Old Curiosity Shop (1911)
For the Love of a Girl (1912)
The Third Degree (1913)
The Wolf (1914 film)
The Evangelist (1916 film) (1916), adapted from the 1907 play
Bought (early film) (1915)
The Great Ruby (1915)
McTeague (film), also known as Life's Whirlpool (1916)
 A Woman's Way (1916)
Husband and Wife (1916)
The Evangelist (1916)
A Woman's Way (early film) 
The Unpardonable Sin (early film)
The Weakness of Man
The Revolt (early film)
Hidden Scar

Writer
The Third Degree (1913 film) (1913)
The Lion and the Mouse (1914 film) (1914)
McTeague (film), also known as Life's Whirlpool (1916)

References

1865 births
1918 deaths
American film directors
Members of The Lambs Club